A Box of Birds is the twelfth album by the Australian psychedelic rock band The Church, released in September 1999. It consists of cover versions of tracks by artists who were influential on the group's music.

The album was released after the band's decision to abandon an already-complete live album and was recorded and mixed in 10 days. Guitarist Marty Willson-Piper said the band had played several covers in its gigs over the years, including "The Porpoise Song", "It's All Too Much" and "Cortez the Killer" – "and we thought, why not put them on a record. So we came along with our own ideas. Tim wanted to do an Iggy Pop number, Peter wanted "Cortez", Steve wanted Kevin Ayers and I wanted to do Alex Harvey. We had to pick 10 after an initial list of about 40."

Kevin Ayers' song "Decadence" has been described as 'a withering portrait of Nico.'

Track listing

Personnel 

Steve Kilbey – lead vocals, bass guitar, keyboards, guitar
Peter Koppes – guitars, keyboards, bass guitar, backing vocals
Tim Powles – drums, percussion, backing vocals
Marty Willson-Piper – guitars, bass guitar, backing vocals

References 

The Church (band) albums
1999 albums
Covers albums